The Dark Eye: Chains of Satinav is a 2012 graphic adventure game developed by the German studio Daedalic Entertainment and published by Deep Silver. Part of The Dark Eye series, the game is set in the fictional place of Aventuria within the Kingdom of Andergast. The player controls the protagonist, Geron, who tries to save the town from disaster.

Gameplay
The Dark Eye: Chains of Satinav is controlled with a point-and-click interface.

Development
The Dark Eye: Chains of Satinav was announced in 2010 at a German convention to be released some time in 2012. In February 2012, the release was scheluded for March 23, 2012. In March 2012, the game was delayed to second quarter of 2012. In May 2012, the game was announced for release on 22 June 2012. The game was released for Nintendo Switch, PlayStation 4, and Xbox One on 27 January 2021.

Reception

The Dark Eye: Chains of Satinav received "generally positive" reviews, according to review aggregator Metacritic.

Sequel
Daedalic Entertainment followed The Dark Eye: Chains of Satinav with a sequel, The Dark Eye: Memoria.

Notes

References

External links
Official website (archived)
Official website 

2012 video games
Adventure games
Daedalic Entertainment games
Fantasy video games
MacOS games
Nintendo Switch games
PlayStation 4 games
Point-and-click adventure games
Video games based on tabletop role-playing games
Video games developed in Germany
Windows games
Xbox One games
Deep Silver games
Single-player video games